Taarkata is a 2014 Bangladeshi romantic thriller film written and directed by Mohammad Mostafa Kamal Raz, starring Arifin Shuvoo, Bidya Sinha Saha Mim with Moushumi, Faruque Ahmed, Dr. Ezazul Islam and Ahmed Sharif in supporting roles. The film was produced by Shukla Banik under Ping Pong Entertainment banner. It was the third direction of Mohammad Mostafa Kamal Raz, and second collaboration between Arifin Shuvoo and Mohammad Mostafa Kamal Raz after Chaya Chobi.

The story centers around Ibrahim, a notorious criminal who falls in love with a simple girl, an aspiring singer who comes from a middle-class family. The first part of the film explores the events which led to Ibrahim becoming a criminal. The second part of the film introduces the antagonist.

Synopsis
The story centers around a middle class brother and sister, Ibrahim (Arifin Shuvoo) and Moushumi, and their family. Ibrahim becomes involved in illegal activities with a gang and causes others to be fearful when he acted as a Mafia don. He becomes romantically involved with Chad (Bidya Sinha Saha Mim), an aspiring singer who comes from a middle-class family. It is an action film with romance, starring three very capable stars.

Cast
Arifin Shuvoo as Ibrahim aka Ibu
Bidya Sinha Saha Mim as Chad
Moushumi as Ibrahim's elder sister
Faruque Ahmed as Aslam Sheikh
Dr.Ezazul Islam as Musa Raj
Omar Sani as his late brother-in-law
Lubaba Diya as the child artist
Ahmed Sharif
Hasan Masood as Suruj Khan
Kochi Khondokar
 Md. Nazim Uddin Raju
 Zoya Chatterjee
 Md. Matiur Rahman
 Bablu Bosh
 Monir Hossain
 Mohammad Majedul Haque Rana
 A.B. Rokon
 Sajib Neev
 Parijat Chokroborty

Music
The music of the film has been composed by Arifin Rumey. Music has been produced under the banner of Laser Vision.  The music was released on 10 April 2014. The album consists of 12 tracks.

** The film version duration may differ from original audio album

References

External links
 Tarkata on Bangla Movie Database

2014 films
2014 action thriller films
2014 crime thriller films
2010s Bengali-language films
2010s romantic thriller films
Bengali-language Bangladeshi films
Bangladeshi action thriller films
Bangladeshi crime thriller films
Bangladeshi romantic thriller films
Films scored by Arfin Rumey